Patrick Henry McGehee (July 2, 1888 – December 30, 1946) was a Major League Baseball pitcher who played in one game for the Detroit Tigers on August 23, . He faced two batters, and allowed one hit and one Base on balls.

External links

1888 births
1946 deaths
Detroit Tigers players
Major League Baseball pitchers
Baseball players from Mississippi
Jackson Tigers players
Greenwood Scouts players
Vicksburg Hill Billies players
People from Meadville, Mississippi